Mel Lopez Boulevard is a , six-to-ten lane divided highway in northern Manila, Philippines, connecting Bonifacio Drive in Port Area in the south with Radial Road 10 (R-10) in Navotas in the north. The highway is the main component of the R-10 network, which runs north of the Pasig River, and is an extension of Bonifacio Drive (Radial Road 1 or R-1) north of the Anda Circle, running north–south through the Manila North Port area serving the coastal districts of Tondo and Port Area, as well as San Nicolas and Intramuros.

Route description

Mel Lopez Boulevard originates at Anda Circle, the intersection with Andres Soriano Avenue, Bonifacio Drive, and Roberto Oca Street, as a continuation of Bonifacio Drive in Port Area. It crosses the Pasig River via Roxas Bridge (also known as Mel Lopez Bridge and Del Pan Bridge), where the road transitions from R-1 to R-10. It then comes into an intersection with Recto Avenue, Del Pan Street, and MICT South Access Road at the district boundary of San Nicolas and Tondo; traffic passing above is carried by the M. Lopez Flyover. The boulevard then heads northwest toward Pier 4 of the Manila North Harbor before bending north into the Moriones and Don Bosco villages of Tondo. The road passes east of the entire Manila North Port terminal complex and leaves Barrio Magsaysay for Barrio Vitas past Capulong Street (C-2). Continuing north, it soon crosses over the Estero de Vitas (Vitas Creek) and enters the Balut area of Tondo where the old dumpsite of Smokey Mountain is located. The boulevard terminates at the Maralla Bridge, which crosses over the Estero de Marala (Navotas River).

North of the estero, the boulevard extends into the reclaimed fish port complex of Navotas running parallel to North Bay Boulevard as Radial Road 10 (R-10), which runs up to Circumferential Road 4 (C-4) above the Tullahan River.

History
Radial Road 10 was built on reclaimed land called Tondo Foreshoreland, reclaimed in the 1950s as part of a government plan to expand and improve port facilities in Manila. It soon became the resettlement site of thousands of urban poor families that turned the area into what was once Southeast Asia's largest squatter colony. The road itself was constructed between 1976 and 1979 as part of the Manila Urban Development Project of the Ferdinand Marcos administration, and was initially named Marcos Road.

In January 2017, a bill was filed by Buhay Party-List Representative and former Manila Mayor Lito Atienza in the Philippine House of Representatives changing the name of this portion of Radial Road 10 to Mayor Gemiliano Lopez Boulevard in honor of the late Manila Mayor Mel Lopez. In April 2019, President Rodrigo Duterte signed Republic Act No. 11280, officially renaming the highway to Mel Lopez Boulevard. With the renaming, the segment of Bonifacio Drive from Anda Circle to Roxas Bridge became part of Mel Lopez Boulevard.

Landmarks

 Amado Hernandez Elementary School
 Club Intramuros Golf Course (Clubhouse)
 Delpan Sports Complex
 Department of Public Works and Highways – South Manila District Engineering Office
 Don Bosco Tondo Church
 Don Bosco Tondo Football Field
 Manila Harbour Centre
 Manila North Harbor
 Philippine Ports Authority
 Philippine Red Cross Port Area
 Smokey Mountain
 Vitas Industrial Estate

References

Streets in Manila
Tondo, Manila
Roads in Metro Manila